Clark Davis (born 15 May 1957 in Calgary) is a Canadian former wrestler who competed in the 1984 Summer Olympics and in the 1988 Summer Olympics.

References

1957 births
Living people
Sportspeople from Calgary
Olympic wrestlers of Canada
Wrestlers at the 1984 Summer Olympics
Wrestlers at the 1988 Summer Olympics
Canadian male sport wrestlers
Commonwealth Games gold medallists for Canada
Wrestlers at the 1982 Commonwealth Games
Wrestlers at the 1986 Commonwealth Games
Commonwealth Games medallists in wrestling
Pan American Games silver medalists for Canada
Pan American Games medalists in wrestling
World Wrestling Championships medalists
Wrestlers at the 1979 Pan American Games
Medalists at the 1981 Summer Universiade
Medalists at the 1979 Pan American Games
20th-century Canadian people
21st-century Canadian people
Medallists at the 1982 Commonwealth Games
Medallists at the 1986 Commonwealth Games